Jean Claude Marie Trévoux (born February 27, 1905 in Petit Quevilly (Seine-Inférieure) and died on October 29, 1981 in Mexico City) was a French rally and racing driver and winner of four editions of the Monte Carlo Rally.

Biography
Born in Le Petit-Quevilly, Trévoux began his racing career in early 1932 driving a Bugatti and winning the Criterium Paris to Nice race. He also drove a Bentley Blower at the Le Mans 24 Hours that year but crashed out on the first lap.

In 1934 Jean took the first of his four wins at Monte-Carlo, as co-driver to Louis Gas. In 1939 he took a joint win with Joseph Paul. After racing returned following World War II, he claimed two other wins, driving a Hotchkiss and Delahaye 175 respectively.

Also success in Rallye du Maroc 1935 and 1937, and Criterium International de Tourisme Paris-Nice 1934.

He later settled in Mexico during the late 1940s, marrying a Mexican woman and opening a restaurant in Mexico City called Restaurant Bar La Cucaracha.

References

External links
 
 
 
 
 
 
 

1905 births
1981 deaths
French rally drivers
People from Le Petit-Quevilly
French rally co-drivers
Sportspeople from Seine-Maritime
French emigrants to Mexico
Carrera Panamericana drivers
French racing drivers
24 Hours of Le Mans drivers